Alexander Lüderitz (born 6 August 1973) is a former freestyle swimmer from Berlin, who swam in the qualifying heats of the 4×100 m freestyle relay at the 1996 Summer Olympics in Atlanta, Georgia. In the final he was replaced by Christian Tröger who, alongside Bengt Zikarsky, Björn Zikarsky, and Mark Pinger won the bronze medal.

References

1973 births
Living people
German male swimmers
Olympic swimmers of Germany
Swimmers at the 1996 Summer Olympics
Olympic bronze medalists for Germany
Swimmers from Berlin
Olympic bronze medalists in swimming
German male freestyle swimmers
Medalists at the FINA World Swimming Championships (25 m)
European Aquatics Championships medalists in swimming
Medalists at the 1996 Summer Olympics
Goodwill Games medalists in swimming
Competitors at the 1998 Goodwill Games
20th-century German people
21st-century German people